David Mikics is the Moores Distinguished Professor in the Department of English and the Honors College, University of Houston.

His book on Stanley Kubrick in the Yale Jewish Lives series was published in 2020. His book about Saul Bellow entitled Bellow’s People: How Saul Bellow Made Life Into Art (W.W. Norton) was published in 2016.
Mikics, a Guggenheim Fellow for 2017, is a regular columnist for Tablet magazine. He lives with his wife and son in Brooklyn and Houston.

Bibliography
Stanley Kubrick: American Filmmaker,Yale University Press, 2020
The American Canon by Harold Bloom (Editor), Library of America, 2020
Bellow's People: How Saul Bellow Made Life Into Art,W.W. Norton and Co., 2016
Slow Reading in a Hurried Age, Harvard/Belknap, 2013 
The Annotated Emerson(Editor), Harvard/Belknap, 2012
The Art of the Sonnet, (with Stephanie Burt) Harvard/Belknap, 2011
Who Was Jacques Derrida? Yale University Press, 2009
A New Handbook of Literary Terms, Yale University Press, 2007
The Romance of Individualism in Emerson and Nietzsche, Ohio University Press, 2003

References

1961 births
Living people
American academics of English literature
University of Houston faculty